Shawty, shorty, shauty  or shortie is a slang term from African American Vernacular English used as a term of endearment but also frequently heard as a catcall. After the 1990s, the term has largely referred to a young and attractive woman. Some people consider this term condescending and pejorative. It was particularly popular in hip hop from the 2000s. Shawty is a Southern or rather African American variant of shorty, and can also refer to someone of a short height compared to a taller person, a newcomer, a child, or a good friend.

In hip hop music
Below is a list of songs which contain the term in the lyrics. 
 "Method Man", a 1993 song by Wu-Tang Clan
 ”Gimme the Loot”, a 1994 song by The Notorious B.I.G.
 "C.R.E.A.M.", a 1994 song by Wu-Tang Clan
 "Shorty Wanna Be a Thug", a 1996 song by 2 Pac
 "In da Club", a 2003 song by 50 Cent
 "Shorty Wanna Ride", a 2004 song by Young Buck
 "Touch It", a 2005 song by Busta Rhymes
 "Shortie Like Mine", a 2006 song by Bow Wow
 "Low (Flo Rida song)", a 2007 song by Flo Rida
 "Bartender", a 2007 song by T-Pain feat. Akon
 "Cyclone", a 2007 song by Baby Bash feat. T-Pain
 "Shawty", a 2007 single by Plies
 "Low", 2007 song by Flo Rida and T-Pain
 "Get It Shawty", a 2007 song by Lloyd
 "Shawty Is a 10", a 2007 song by The-Dream
 "Killa (Cherish song)", a 2007 song by Cherish (group)
 "Sexy Can I", a 2008 song by Ray J feat. Yung Berg
 "Shawty Get Loose", a 2008 single by Lil Mama
 "Shawty Say", a 2008 song by David Banner
 "Right Round", a 2009 song by Flo Rida feat. Ke$ha
 "Sugar (Flo Rida song)", a 2009 song by Flo Rida feat. Wynter
 "Shawty Wus Up", a 2010 song by Dondria
 "Just a Dream (Nelly song)", a 2010 song by Nelly
 "Wop", a 2011 song by J. Dash feat. Flo Rida
 "Whistle", a 2012 song by Flo Rida
 "No Mediocre", a 2014 song by T.I. feat. Iggy Azalea
 "Hot N*gga", a 2014 song by Bobby Shmurda
 "My Oh My (Camila Cabello song)", a 2020 song by Camila Cabello feat. DaBaby, used only by DaBaby during the rap verses of the song
 "Mood", a 2020 song by 24kGoldn feat. Iann Dior
 "Mood Swings", a 2020 song by Pop Smoke feat. Lil Tjay
 "Shawty", a 2020 song by Luciana
 "SHAWTY", a 2020 song by Rondo da Sosa feat. Capo Plaza
 "cocaine shawty", a 2021 song by Lil Peep feat. Yunggoth

Other genres
 "Wild, Wild West (The Escape Club song)", a 1988 song by The Escape Club
 "Shorty", a 1996 song by The Get Up Kids
 "No Scrubs", a 1999 song by TLC
 "Angel", a 2001 song by Shaggy feat. Rayvon
 "Replay", a 2009 single by Iyaz
 "One Time (Justin Bieber song)", a 2009 song by Justin Bieber
 "Eenie Meenie", a 2010 song by Sean Kingston and Justin Bieber
 "She's A Dream", a 2009 song by Backstreet Boys.
 "Mistletoe", a 2011 song by Justin Bieber.
 "Controlla", a 2016 song by Drake
 "Emiliana", a 2021 single by CKay
 "Calm Down", a 2022 song by Rema
 "Convéncete", a song by Princesa Alba
 "Ropes", a 2021 song by Dirty Palm

References

Hip hop phrases